Charles Ian McMillan Jones, FRSA (born 11 October 1934) is an English sportsman and academic who served as teacher and educational administrator from 1960 to 1997. He played cricket between 1959 and 1969, including the 1969 Gillette Cup and was also an Olympic field hockey player, representing Britain at the 1960 and the 1964 Summer Olympics.

Biography
Born in United Kingdom's third-largest city, Leeds, Ian Jones was educated at Bishop's Stortford College and at St John's College, Cambridge. He was a second lieutenant in the Royal Artillery, between 1953 and 1955, head of the geography department at Bishop's Stortford College, between 1960 and 1970, and vice-principal of King William's College, between 1971 and 1975. He was headmaster of Bedford School, between 1975 and 1986, director of studies at Britannia Royal Naval College, between 1986 and 1988, and project director at CfBT Education Trust, between 1988 and 1997.

Cricket
Jones' batting style remains to be described, but it is known that he bowled right-arm medium pace. He made his first-class debut for Cambridge University against Worcestershire in 1959. He batted once in this match, in the course of which he was dismissed for a duck by Derek Pearson. He made a further first-class appearance for the university, which came in that season against Middlesex. In this match, Jones was dismissed for a duck in the Cambridge first-innings by Robert Caple, while in their second-innings he scored 44 runs before being dismissed by Bob Hurst.

In 1959, Jones made his debut for Hertfordshire against Cambridgeshire in the Minor Counties Championship. He played minor counties cricket for Hertfordshire between 1959 and 1969, making 33 Minor Counties Championship appearances. He made his List A debut against Devon in the 1st round of the 1969 Gillette Cup, scoring 19 runs before being dismissed by Robert Healey, in a match which Hertfordshire won by 98 runs. He made his second and final List A appearance in the second round of the same competition against Glamorgan. In this match, he was dismissed for a duck by Malcolm Nash, with Glamorgan winning the match by 85 runs.

Hockey
Jones played field hockey for Hertfordshire, Cambridge University, England and Great Britain, representing Great Britain in the 1960 and the 1964 Olympic Games. He was manager of the England Schoolboy Hockey XI, between 1967 and 1974, manager of the England Hockey XI, between 1968 and 1969, and president of the English Schoolboys Hockey Association, between 1980 and 1988.

References

External links
Ian Jones at ESPNcricinfo
Ian Jones at CricketArchive

1934 births
Living people
Cricketers from Leeds
Sportspeople from Leeds
Alumni of St John's College, Cambridge
People educated at Bishop's Stortford College
Headmasters of Bedford School
British academic administrators
English cricketers
Cambridge University cricketers
Hertfordshire cricketers
English male field hockey players
Field hockey players at the 1960 Summer Olympics
Field hockey players at the 1964 Summer Olympics
Olympic field hockey players of Great Britain
British male field hockey players
Royal Artillery officers
Southgate Hockey Club players